Gylfaginning (Old Norse: 'The Beguiling of Gylfi' or 'The Deluding of Gylfi'; c. 20,000 words; 13th century Old Norse pronunciation ) is the first part of the 13th century Prose Edda after the Prologue. The Gylfaginning deals with the creation and destruction of the world of the Æsir and many other aspects of Norse mythology. The second part of the Prose Edda is called the Skáldskaparmál and the third Háttatal.

Summary 
The Gylfaginning tells the story of Gylfi, a king of "the land that men now call Sweden", who, after being tricked by one of the goddesses of the Æsir, wonders if all Æsir use magic and tricks for their will to be done. This is why he journeys to Asgard, but on the way he is tricked by the gods and arrives in some other place, where he finds a great palace. Inside the palace he encounters a man who asks Gylfi's name and so King Gylfi introduces himself as Gangleri. Gangleri then is taken to the king of the palace and comes upon three men: High, Just-As-High, and Third.

Gangleri is then challenged to show his wisdom by asking questions, as is the custom in many sagas. Each question made to High, Just-As-High, and Third is about an aspect of the Norse mythology or its gods, and also about the creation and destruction of the world (Ragnarök). In the end all the palace and its people just vanish and Gylfi is left standing on empty ground. It is then implied that as Gylfi returns to his nation, he retells the tales he was told. It can be argued that the author(s) used this narrative device as a means of being able to safely document a vanishing and largely oral tradition within a Christian context.

References

Citations

General and cited references

External links

 Gylfaginning in Old Norse at heimskringla.no
 Text of all original manuscripts
 The text with modern Icelandic spelling
 English translation

Eschatology in Norse mythology
Sources of Norse mythology
Old Norse prose